Louis Weinert-Wilton, born as Alois Weinert (11 May 1875 – 4 September 1945) was a Sudeten German playwright and novelist.

During the boom in Krimi films in West German cinema during the 1960s, several of his mystery novels were adapted into films due to their similarity with the popular Edgar Wallace series of Rialto Film.

Filmography 
 (dir. Harald Reinl, 1962)
The White Spider (dir. Harald Reinl, 1963)
The Secret of the Black Widow (dir. Franz Josef Gottlieb, 1963)
The Secret of the Chinese Carnation (dir. Rudolf Zehetgruber, 1964)

References

Bibliography
 Goble, Alan. The Complete Index to Literary Sources in Film. Walter de Gruyter, 1999.

External links

1875 births
1945 deaths
Writers from Plzeň
Sudeten German people
German-language writers
People from Tachov District
Czechoslovak writers